Gosper County is a county located in the U.S. state of Nebraska. As of the 2020 United States census, the population was 1,893. Its county seat is Elwood. The county was formed in 1873, and was organized in 1881. It was named for John J. Gosper, a Nebraska Secretary of State.

Gosper County is part of the Lexington, NE Micropolitan Statistical Area.

In the Nebraska license plate system, Gosper County is represented by the prefix 73 (it had the seventy-third-largest number of vehicles registered in the county when the license plate system was established in 1922).

Geography
The Platte River flows easterly through the top part of Gosper County.

Major highways
  U.S. Highway 283
  Nebraska Highway 18
  Nebraska Highway 23

Adjacent counties

 Phelps County (east)
 Furnas County (south)
 Frontier County (west)
 Dawson County (north)

Protected areas
 Gosper National Wildlife Management Area
 Johnson Lake State Recreation Area
 Phillips Lake State Recreation Area

Demographics

As of the 2000 United States Census, there were 2,143 people, 863 households, and 655 families in the county. The population density was 5 people per square mile (2/km2). There were 1,281 housing units at an average density of 3 per square mile (1/km2). The racial makeup of the county was 98.79% White, 0.14% Native American, 0.23% Asian, 0.42% from other races, and 0.42% from two or more races. 1.26% of the population were Hispanic or Latino of any race.

There were 863 households, out of which 29.90% had children under the age of 18 living with them, 69.10% were married couples living together, 3.90% had a female householder with no husband present, and 24.10% were non-families. 22.80% of all households were made up of individuals, and 10.50% had someone living alone who was 65 years of age or older. The average household size was 2.42 and the average family size was 2.83.

The county population contained 23.80% under the age of 18, 5.40% from 18 to 24, 24.00% from 25 to 44, 26.00% from 45 to 64, and 20.80% who were 65 years of age or older. The median age was 43 years. For every 100 females, there were 102.00 males. For every 100 females age 18 and over, there were 101.40 males.

The median income for a household in the county was $36,827, and the median income for a family was $42,702. Males had a median income of $28,836 versus $21,204 for females. The per capita income for the county was $17,957. About 4.80% of families and 7.90% of the population were below the poverty line, including 11.10% of those under age 18 and 5.00% of those age 65 or over.

Communities

Villages 
 Elwood (county seat)
 Smithfield

Unincorporated community 

 Johnson Lake

Politics
Gosper County voters are reliably Republican. In no national election since 1936 has the county selected the Democratic Party candidate (as of 2020).

References

 
Nebraska counties
Lexington Micropolitan Statistical Area
1881 establishments in Nebraska
Populated places established in 1881